Amynthas agrestis, the Asian jumping worm, is a species of worm in the family Megascolecidae. Amynthas agrestis is native to Japan and the Korean Peninsula, and was introduced to North America due to increased human activity during the 19th century; it is considered to be an invasive species in the United States. Worms within the genus Amynthas (jumping worms) reproduce and develop quicker than their European counterparts.

Ecology 
The Amynthas agrestis became a problem in the United States, specifically the Southern United States, during the 19th century. There is increasing concern about this invasive species.

One of the main concerns is the over-consumption of leaf litter, which will impact the microbial and species diversity of the native soil. Many of these ecological scientists have created ways to control this invasive species. One of the main ways to control Amynthas agrestis is controlled burn in grassy fields and some forests. This method removes leaf litter, the main food source for Amynthas agrestis, which should thoroughly control the overall population of Asian worms.

Life cycle 
The Asian jumping worm follows an annual life cycle. At least six months out of the year, it spends its time in the larval stage, then adults appear between May and June.

Notes

References

Megascolecidae